The Christian R. and Mary F. Lindback Award is given out by the Christian R. and Mary F. Lindback Foundation.

History
Christian Lindback was the president and owner of Abbotts Dairies. He was also a trustee of Bucknell University. His foundation established the Lindback Awards, for distinguished teaching at colleges and universities in New Jersey, Pennsylvania, Maryland, Delaware, and Virginia. The award includes an honorarium and a medallion.

Notable recipients
Matthew Adler (born 1962), Richard A. Horvitz Professor of Law at Duke University School of Law.
Norman Adler (1941-2016), professor of behavioral neurobiology and evolutionary psychology
Nina Auerbach (1943-2017), John Welsh Centennial Professor of English Emerita at the University of Pennsylvania
Michelle Francl, Professor of Chemistry, Bryn Mawr College, and Adjunct Scholar, Vatican Observatory 
Henry Gleitman (1925–2015), Professor Emeritus of Psychology at the University of Pennsylvania
 Robert A. Gorman (born 1937), Professor of Law at the University of Pennsylvania Law School
Margaret Hastings (1910–1970), historian of Medieval English legal history
Vijay Kumar (born 1962), roboticist and professor in the School of Engineering & Applied Science at the University of Pennsylvania
Helen Kwalwasser (1927-2017), Professor Emeritus of violin at Temple University
Amy Wax (born 1953), the Robert Mundheim Professor of Law at the University of Pennsylvania Law School

References

American education awards
Awards established in 1961
1961 establishments in the United States